James Roland "Jim" Chabot (May 8, 1927 – October 9, 1989) was a Member of the Legislative Assembly of British Columbia, Canada for the riding of Columbia and its successor Columbia River from 1963 to 1986.

He was born in Farnham, Quebec, and moved to British Columbia during the 1950s. He was employed as a railway supervisor. In 1973, he ran unsuccessfully for the leadership of the Social Credit party. Chabot served in the provincial cabinet as Minister of Mines and Petroleum Resources, Minister of Lands, Parks and Housing and Provincial Secretary. He did not run for reelection in 1986. Chabot died at home in Invermere at the age of 62.

James Chabot Provincial Park on Windermere Lake in the Columbia Valley region, which was part of his riding, is named for him.

References

1927 births
1989 deaths
British Columbia Social Credit Party MLAs
Canadian Pacific Railway people
Members of the Executive Council of British Columbia
People from Montérégie
People from the Regional District of East Kootenay
Telegraphists